Frank William Ploetz (April 27, 1870 – May 18, 1944) was an American farmer and politician.

Ploetz was born in Germany and emigrated with his parents to the United States in 1875. Ploetz eventually settled in Coloma, Wisconsin. Ploetz was a farmer. He was involved with the Colona Creamery Company, the Coloma Telephone Company, the Coloma Produce Company, and the Pleasant Lake Summer Resort. Ploetz served in the Wisconsin Assembly from 1919 to 1923 and was a Republican. He also served on the Wisconsin Board of Vocational Education. Ploetz also served as the United States Prohibition agent and the United States Internal Revenue Collector.

Notes

External links

1870 births
1944 deaths
German emigrants to the United States
People from Coloma, Wisconsin
Businesspeople from Wisconsin
Farmers from Wisconsin
Republican Party members of the Wisconsin State Assembly